SJ Tc is a diesel-hydraulic locomotive used in Sweden for line service and snowploughing. Twenty locomotives were built for Swedish State Railways in 1969-71 by Nydquist & Holm for combined freight, line service and snowploughing service, alongside 10 of the larger Tb diesel-electric locomotives. SJ used the locomotives for freight and track work trains during the summer and for snow removal in the winter. In 1984, the locomotives were transferred to the service fleet and they were then mainly used for track work trains.

When the Swedish Rail Administration (Banverket) was created as a demerger from the Swedish State Railways in 1988, all Tc locomotives were transferred to the latter. Since the early-2000s, many units have been taken out of service. As of 2017, only three Tc locomotives remain in operation, two operated by Strukton Rail AB and one operated by Infranord.

They are fitted with a lifting plate in between the driving axles which allows the locomotive to lift itself off the tracks and so be turned around. This feature allows the cab and snowploughs to always face forward. The large snowploughs can also be removed when they are not required for a particular occasion. 

Power for the Tc is provided by a 600 hp (450 kW) diesel prime mover which is manufactured by German engine builder Deutz. This prime mover is attached to a hydraulic transmission which drives the locomotives four driving wheels. The Tc is capable of speeds up to 90 km/h (56 mph).

The Tc is controlled by a single operator from a control cab mounted on one end of the locomotive. The cab features large windows to provide good visibility to the front and sides which assist in safely operating the locomotive.  Alongside this, a Tc locomotives is capable of working in conjunction with another Tc locomotive via a multiple unit arrangement.

See also
 SJ Tb - a similar and larger Swedish locomotive

References

External links

 Järnväg.net on Tc
 Photo Gallery regarding the SJ Tc 

NOHAB locomotives
Tc
B locomotives
Standard gauge locomotives of Sweden
Railway locomotives introduced in 1969